is a former Japanese association football player.

Playing career
Takita was born in Saitama on May 16, 1967. After graduating from Tokai University, he joined his local club NTT Kanto in 1990. He played many matches as goalkeeper from first season. In 1992, he moved to Urawa Reds. He battles with Hisashi Tsuchida for the position for a long time. He could hardly play in the match until 1995. In 1996, he played full time in all matches because Tsuchida got hurt. He also scored a goal against Yokohama Flügels with a penalty shot on November 9, 1996. He became the first J1 League goalkeeper to score in the league. From 1997, he played many matches and became a regular goalkeeper from 1999. He retired with rival Tsuchida end of 2000 season.

Club statistics

References

External links

1967 births
Living people
Tokai University alumni
Association football people from Saitama Prefecture
Japanese footballers
Japan Soccer League players
J1 League players
J2 League players
Omiya Ardija players
Urawa Red Diamonds players
Association football goalkeepers